Mariodian may refer to:
 Marodian, Queensland, a locality in the Fraser Coast Region, Queensland, Australia
 Electoral district of Marodian, a former electorate in Queensland, Australia